Rio Rita may refer to:

Rio Rita (musical), a 1927 musical
Rio Rita (1929 film), starring Bebe Daniels and John Boles
Rio Rita (1942 film), starring Abbott and Costello as the comedy relief
Rio Rita, a character in the Femforce comic book series published by AC Comics
Río Rita, a town in Panama
"Rio Rita" (song), a song recorded by The Four Coins
Rio Rita, a main river passing through East China Normal University in Shanghai, which is synonymous with the university.